Yanto Jones may refer to:

Yanto Jones, fictional character in the TV series Mine All Mine
A common misspelling of Ianto Jones, a character in the TV series Torchwood